Richard D. Nanula was chief financial officer of Amgen Inc. and The Walt Disney Company, chief operating officer of Starwood, and chief executive officer of Broadband Sports. While a principal at Colony Capital, he resigned amid a sex scandal. He is currently the chief executive officer of PureForm Global.

Early life
Nanula was born to an African American mother and an Italian father. He grew up in Pasadena, California and attended the University of California, Santa Barbara, where he received a bachelor's degree in economics in 1982. He graduated from Harvard Business School in 1986, where he received his M.B.A. He later became a certified public accountant.

Career
Nanula held a variety of executive positions at the Walt Disney Company from 1986 until 1998, including senior executive vice president, chief financial officer (1991-1995, 1996–1997)  and president of Disney Stores Worldwide (1995-1996). He served as president and chief operating officer for Starwood in New York from 1998 until 1999, then chairman and chief executive officer at Broadband Sports from 1999 until 2001.

Nanula served as executive vice president of Amgen Inc. in May 2001 and was appointed chief financial officer in August 2001. On April 10, 2007, Amgen announced that he would be resigning from his position "to pursue other opportunities." On May 4, 2007, it was announced that Nanula resigned from the Boeing Company's board of directors, where he had served since January 2005.

Announced in January 2008, Nanula joined Colony Capital, LLC, and was responsible for the firm's global operations, with a special focus on operating company transactions. Nanula resigned from Colony in July 2013 amid allegations of a sex scandal that involved porn stars Trinity St. Clair and Samantha Saint.

As of at least February 2021, he is the CEO of PureForm Global, a manufacturer of cannabinoids.

Personal life
Nanula married Tracey Hart, whom he met at Disney, in 1995. They have three children together. In 2005, Hart filed for divorce.

References

Sources
Boeing Director Nanula Resigns from Board
Colony Capital Senior Executives - Richard D. Nanula
Richard Nanula Exits Colony Capital As Alleged Sex Tape Surfaces

African-American business executives
American accountants
American airline chief executives
American film studio executives
American people of Italian descent
American technology chief executives
Boeing people
Businesspeople from California
Disney executives
Harvard Business School alumni
Living people
People from Pasadena, California
University of California, Santa Barbara alumni
American chief financial officers
American chief operating officers
Year of birth missing (living people)